Medlyn is a site of disused mines near Porkellis in Cornwall, England.

References

Geography of Cornwall